G. D. Baum is an American crime novelist whose detective thrillers are set in Northern New Jersey. His novels feature detective Lock Tourmaline who is skilled in a hybrid form of Okinawan karate and Chinese Shaolin Kung Fu which combines striking, kicking, seizing, and grappling, called Shaolin Kempo Karate. Reviewers describe Baum's novels as having "carefully choreographed martial arts moves" and compare his "clean and breezy" style to that of Dashiell Hammett and Raymond Chandler, One critic suggested there was "too much dialogue", but another suggested it was "rapid-fire" and "real-life".

Books
 Point and Shoot, G. D. Baum, 2006, revised edition 2015
 Sleeping to Death, G. D. Baum, 2015

References

External links
 Author website

American male writers
American crime writers
Writers from New Jersey
Sarah Lawrence College alumni
Living people
Year of birth missing (living people)
Place of birth missing (living people)